Zaachila District is located in the west of the Valles Centrales Region of the State of Oaxaca, Mexico.
The district includes the municipalities of San Antonio Huitepec, San Miguel Peras, San Pablo Cuatro Venados, Santa Inés del Monte, Trinidad Zaachila and Villa de Zaachila.

References

Districts of Oaxaca
Valles Centrales de Oaxaca